Ferroin is the chemical compound with the formula [Fe(o-phen)3]SO4, where o-phen is an abbreviation for 1,10-phenanthroline, a bidentate ligand.  The term "ferroin" is used loosely and includes salts of other anions such as chloride.

Redox indicator

This coordination compound is used as an indicator in analytical chemistry.  The active ingredient is the [Fe(o-phen)3]2+ ion, which is a chromophore that can be oxidized to the ferric derivative [Fe(o-phen)3]3+. The potential for this redox change is +1.06 volts in 1 M H2SO4. It is a popular redox indicator for visualizing oscillatory Belousov–Zhabotinsky reactions.

Ferroin is suitable as a redox indicator, as the color change is reversible, very pronounced and rapid, and the ferroin solution is stable up to 60 °C. It is the main indicator used in cerimetry.

Nitroferroin, the complex of iron(II) with 5-nitro-1,10-phenanthroline, has transition potential of +1.25 volts. It is more stable than ferroin, but in sulfuric acid with Ce4+ ion it requires significant excess of the titrant. It is however useful for titration in perchloric acid or nitric acid solution, where cerium redox potential is higher.

The redox potential of the iron-phenanthroline complex can be varied between +0.84 V and +1.10 V by adjusting the position and number of methyl groups on the phenanthroline core.

Preparation
Ferroin sulfate may be prepared by combining phenanthroline to ferrous sulfate in water.
3 phen + Fe2+ → [Fe(phen)3]2+
The iron is low spin and octahedral with D3 symmetry. The intense color of this ferrous complex arises from a metal-to-ligand charge-transfer transition.

Reaction kinetics 
When sulfuric acid (H2SO4) is added to a solution of [Fe(phen)3]2+, it causes the iron complex to decompose as described by the following reaction:

[Fe(phen)3]2+(aq) + 3 H3O+(l) → Fe2+(aq) + 3 phenH+(aq) + 3 H2O(l)

Thanks to the high molar absorptivity of ferroin (a measure of how much the molecule interacts with light), this decomposition can be observed measuring the solution absorbance over time.

The rate of decomposition is first order in [Fe(phen)3]2+, and zeroth order in 3 H3O+. That means the rate law is:

Decrease in ferroin over Time = k [Ferroin]

where k is the reaction constant, and [Ferroin] is the concentration of ferroin. [H3O+] does not show up in the rate law. The concentration of ferroin over time decreases with exponential decay.

References

Iron complexes
Phenanthrolines